Asian psychology is a branch of cultural psychology that studies psychological concepts as they relate to Asian culture. Psychologists studying these issue are often aligned with cross-cultural psychology. Asian Psychology is the study of countries of Asia and their peoples; the way they behave, act, communicate, and what their belief system, as well as the differences between the native culture and the culture of Asian-Americans is known as "Asian Psychology."

Asian behavior
As pointed out by Shinobu Kitayama, professor of psychology and Director of the Culture & Cognition Program at the University of Michigan, culture can have a profound impact on the way people think about and perceive the world around them. East Asians may think differently from Westerners (See also, Cultural differences in self-concept and Self-construal.) Kitayama proposed that unlike the traditional American point-of-view which accentuates the importance of one's self and makes oneself independent, an Asian will instead feel more interdependent.

Movement
Asian psychologists wanted to have an expanding role in the science of psychology, but felt limited due to the heavy western influence. Predominant figures in Asian psychology are Qicheng Jing in China, Hiroshi Azuma in Japan, Ku-Shu Yang in Taiwan, and Durganand Sinha in India.

Asian American Journal of Psychology
The Asian American Journal of Psychology® is the official publication of the Asian American Psychological Association and is dedicated to research, practice, advocacy, education, and policy within Asian American psychology. The Journal publishes empirical, theoretical, methodological, and practice oriented articles and book reviews covering topics relevant to Asian American individuals and communities, including prevention, intervention, training, and social justice. Particular consideration is given to empirical articles using quantitative, qualitative, and mixed methodology.

Asian Journal of Social Psychology
The Asian Journal of Social Psychology stimulates research and encourages academic exchanges for the advancement of social psychology in Asia. It publishes theoretical and empirical papers by Asian scholars and those interested in Asian cultures and societies.
 
The Asian Journal of Social Psychology is partly funded by a Grant-in-Aid for Publication of Scientific Research Results from the Japan Society for the Promotion of Science.

AAPA Online
AAPA was founded in 1972 and is the largest organization of faculty, students, researchers, and practitioners interested in Asian American psychology. Our members and initiatives have positively impacted psychological treatment, education, training, research, policy and social justice advocacy, through research dissemination, organizational policy statements and collaboration with other psychological organizations for publications, training initiatives, and disseminating resources for serving Asian American communities.

Contributions
Over the years, the contribution to the study of psychology was done mostly by US European psychologists, however, in recent years this has been changing. More Asian countries than ever before are contributing to psychology at an ever increasing rate.

See also
 Filipino psychology
 Morita therapy
 Naikan therapy

References

External links
 AAPA Online
 Asian American Journal of Psychology
 Asian Journal of Social Psychology

Branches of psychology
Asian studies